In mathematics, the Grauert–Riemenschneider vanishing theorem is an extension of the Kodaira vanishing theorem on the vanishing of higher cohomology groups of coherent sheaves on a compact complex manifold, due to .

Grauert–Riemenschneider conjecture 
The Grauert–Riemenschneider conjecture is a conjecture related to the Grauert–Riemenschneider vanishing theorem:

This conjecture was proved by  using the Riemann–Roch type theorem (Hirzebruch–Riemann–Roch theorem) and by  using Morse theory.

Note

Reference 

Theorems in algebraic geometry